Scarborough railway station, formerly Scarborough Central, is a Grade II listed station serving the seaside town of Scarborough, North Yorkshire.

From 1907 until 2010 the station approaches were controlled from a 120-lever signal box named Falsgrave (at the outer end of platform 1 and close to the former excursion station at ). In its final years Falsgrave box controlled a mixture of colour-light and semaphore signals, including a gantry carrying 11 semaphores. The signal box was decommissioned in September 2010 and the gantry was dismantled and removed in October 2010. Its new home was Grosmont railway station, on the North Yorkshire Moors Railway. The new signalling is a relay-based interlocking with two- and three-aspect LED signals controlled from an extension to the existing panel at nearby . Simplification of the track layout and major renewals took place at the same time.

History
Scarborough station opened on Monday 7 July 1845, following the completion of the line from York. All the shops closed, and an estimated ten to fifteen thousand spectators saw it arrive.

The original station building was designed by G.T. Andrews. It had a wrought-iron and glazed roof, 348 feet long by 88 feet wide, in two spans and 30 feet from the rails. On the opening day the station was complete except for the overall roof, and the goods shed in the station yard had not been built.

The main station building included: a large central booking office, superintendent room, 1st class, 2nd class and Ladies' waiting rooms, toilets, porters' room, storeroom and refreshment room. Above the refreshment room was originally the station master's house, later the station hotel with ten bedrooms.

At first there were two platforms connected at the north end, with four tracks in between them, each track having a pair of turntables, one at each end of the platforms. Gradually as traffic increased modifications were made to the station layout.

To accommodate excursion traffic two new platforms were added in 1883, now known as platforms 1 and 2. Separate waiting rooms and more facilities were provided. The station clock, built by Potts of Leeds and costing £110 , was added in about 1884.

During the 1890s and until 1903 goods traffic was moved from the station yard to Gallows Close so that more platforms could be provided. The original goods shed, which was next to the station building, became platforms 6 to 9. Trains for the Forge Valley line often used these four platforms.

Platform 1A was formed out of platform 1 for easier access to the Whitby line and opened for the beginning of the summer timetable in 1934.

Until 1965 the station also served a line from Whitby and until 1950 from Pickering. The station was previously named Scarborough Central to distinguish it from the now closed  on the York to Scarborough Line. In the late 1960s most of the roof that covered platforms 1 and 2 was demolished, leaving these platforms outdoors, though the platforms still remain in use today

By the early 1980s regular use of platforms 6-9 had declined and following a simplification of the track layout in 1985 they were taken out of use and demolished. The land they had occupied is now used for car and coach parking, though the overall roofs and brick walls remain.

The current  to  service used to continue to Scarborough alongside other TransPennine Express services. This was operated by Arriva Trains Northern until Northern Rail took over the franchise in 2004.

Station Masters

T. Mennell 1847 - 1866
John Bearup 1870 - 1882
William Taylor 1882 - 1890
George Brown 1890 - 1912
Albert Horsley 1912 - 1921
Frederick Dowson 1922 - 1943
Harold Baines 1944 - 1946 (formerly station master at Basford and Bulwell, afterwards station master at Hull Paragon)
J.G. Handley 1946 - 1947 (formerly station master at Bridlington, afterwards station master at Sunderland)
Ernest Brooks 1948 - ???? (formerly station master at Manors and Jesmond)
W.A.A. Scott 1954 - 1957
A. Maleham 1957 - 1959
J.F. Layton 1959 - ????
G.E. Hunter ca. 1963

Facilities

Scarborough station has a Travel Centre, ticket office, touch-screen ticket machines and a Pumpkin Cafe. The main building has a small waiting room.

Outside the station are a taxi rank and several bus shelters/stops where local and longer-distance bus services depart and arrive. These include Arriva North East route X93 to Whitby and Middlesbrough via the A171; Yorkshire Coastliner services to West Yorkshire via the A64; and East Yorkshire route 128 (to Pickering/Helmsley via the A170) and routes south along the A165 to Filey/Bridlington.

Benches are provided throughout the station, which is staffed at all times. The station also has two payphones, a vending machine and luggage trolleys, as well as toilets and cycle racks. Step-free access is available to all platforms.

Services

TransPennine Express
The typical off-peak service from the station is:

Rolling stock used: Class 185 Desiro diesel multiple units, Class 68 locomotives with Mark 5a coaching stock and Class 802 bi-mode trains.

Northern Trains

Rolling stock used: Class 170 Turbostar and [[British Rail Class 158|Class 158 Express Sprinter]].

From 2000 until 2019, Midland Mainline and successors East Midlands Trains and East Midlands Railway operated one return service from and to London St Pancras via Doncaster on Summer Saturdays initially with Class 170s and later Class 222s.<ref>Now it's Midland Mainline to Scarborough The Railway Magazine issue 1189 May 2000 page 39</ref>

In summer West Coast Railways operates steam locomotive hauled Scarborough Spa Express services from York.

Scarborough is also a popular destination for charter services as it has an operational turntable.

Future of the station
Three different proposals were put forward at the November 2009 Town Team meeting by SNAP Architects (Hull) with Local Transport Projects (Beverley) on the development of the Scarborough station area. All the proposals focused on different aspects (such as community/green/transport) of development. All three proposed improving the station frontage and opening up an entrance to the south of the station.

Service improvements
The new TPE and Northern franchises, which started in April 2016, were committed to improved service frequencies and rolling stock on both lines - the York route was have two departures per hour instead of the previous one as of December 2019, both operators offering an hourly service as far as York, whilst the Hull line now has an hourly timetable seven days per week. The latter was introduced at the May 2019 timetable change, but plans for the York line to go to 2tph have since been put on hold due to lack of available rolling stock.

The improved service saw a new £7 million train servicing depot built in Scarborough to maintain the rolling stock.

Accident
On 10 August 1943 Scarborough station was the scene of an accident between two trains at platform 5. The late-running 09:05 express from Hull was wrongly routed by the signalman and hit the 11:18 stopping train, which was waiting to depart. Four passengers in the first coach of the stopping train – all soldiers – were killed, eight received serious injuries and a further 22 suffered minor injuries. Nobody was injured on the express train.

Local connections

References

External links

The Flying Scotsman arriving in Scarborough – Webshots.com
Scarborough's Urban Renaissance – Scarborough Station Re-development

Railway stations in Scarborough, North Yorkshire
Former North Eastern Railway (UK) stations
Railway stations in Great Britain opened in 1845
Stations on the Hull to Scarborough line
Northern franchise railway stations
Railway stations served by TransPennine Express
Grade II listed buildings in North Yorkshire
George Townsend Andrews railway stations
Grade II listed railway stations
DfT Category C1 stations